Lyudmila Savrulina (born 25 July 1951) is a Russian former speed skater. She competed in three events at the 1972 Winter Olympics, representing the Soviet Union.

References

External links
 

1951 births
Living people
Russian female speed skaters
Olympic speed skaters of the Soviet Union
Speed skaters at the 1972 Winter Olympics
People from Magadan
Sportspeople from Magadan Oblast